is the 12th album by Buck-Tick, released on March 6, 2002. It reached number twelve on the Oricon chart with 28,770 copies sold. "21st Cherry Boy" contains some lyrics from T.Rex's "20th Century Boy". The album is thematically connected to the next release, Mona Lisa Overdrive: the last instrumental song in Kyokutou I Love You gives the musical foundation to the first song in Mona Lisa Overdrive, while the base of the last song of that album recurs in the first song of Kyokutou I Love You.

Track listing

Personnel
Buck-Tick
 Atsushi Sakurai – vocals
 Hisashi Imai – guitar
 Hidehiko Hoshino – guitar
 Yutaka Higuchi – bass
 Toll Yagami – drums

Additional performers
 Kazutoshi Yokoyama - manipulate, keyboards and noises

Production
 Hiromi Yoshizawa - executive producer

References 

2002 albums
Buck-Tick albums
Japanese-language albums